is a Japanese recording artist, songwriter, dancer, model, and actress. She is a former member of the Japanese idol girl group AKB48. She was born in Yokohama, Kanagawa Prefecture. In 2011 she debuted solo with a single titled "Dear J", which was followed the same year by "Fui ni" (number 1 in Japan), and later by "10nen Go no Kimi e" (2012) and "1%" (2013).

Life and career

2005–2013: Early career beginnings and AKB48
In 2005, Itano joined the Japanese idol girl group AKB48 as part of the first team, Team A. She also modeled for the women's fashion magazine Cawaii!, and released her first photo book titled T.O.M.O.row in April 2009. In early 2010, she played Shibuya in AKB48's TV Tokyo drama Majisuka Gakuen. She had a recurring role on Kamen Rider W as Queen, alongside fellow AKB48 performer Tomomi Kasai, until the show ended in late 2010. Together, they made up the sub-unit Queen & Elizabeth. In AKB48's 2010 general election, she placed fourth overall.

2010-2013: Solo Singles and Majisuka Gakuen 2 

Itano released her first single, "Dear J", on January 26, 2011. It reached number 1 on the Oricon daily ranking and number 2 on the Oricon weekly ranking, selling 204,981 copies. In April, she reprised her role as Shibuya in Majisuka Gakuen 2. Her first digital single "Wanna Be Now" reached number 2 on Recochoku's daily charts and number 6 on the weekly charts. She placed eighth overall in AKB48's 2011 general election held in June. Her second single, "Fui ni", was released on July 13 and sold 90,103 copies, and reached number one on the Oricon weekly chart.

In 2012, Itano was cited as the "Queen of TV commercials" for having more contracts with companies than any other female tarento (although her count of 20 was technically a tie with those of fellow AKB48 member Mariko Shinoda).

2013: Graduation from AKB48 and new beginnings

On February 1, 2013, during an AKB48 stage greeting, Itano announced she was leaving the group. She released her fourth solo single, "1%", on June 12. The title track was used in television commercials for Samantha Vega. The music video was shot in New York, and includes an appearance by the American actress and model Taylor Momsen. Itano had her farewell "graduation" ceremony at the Tokyo Dome on August 25, and a follow-up performance on August 27 at the AKB48 Theater; the performance was streamed live by Nico Nico Namahousou. Her graduation song is "Saigo no Door", which was released as a B-side on one of the editions of AKB48's single "Koisuru Fortune Cookie".

2014–present: Solo career success 
In an interview with Japanese entertainment website Nihongogo, Itano shared her thoughts on transitioning to a solo artist "In a group you perform as a unit with each member playing a certain character role, however as a solo artist you have to be able to play all the roles at once. You have to take on the roles of being cool, sexy, and cute and although it’s definitely a challenge, it’s something I have to strive for achieving."

In July 2014, Tomomi Itano made her U.S. performance debut at Union Square in San Francisco for J-POP Summit Festival 2014.

Tomomi Itano has been cast the lead role of a Japanese foreign student based in China alongside Taiwanese singer-actor Dino Lee in the Chinese romance movie Raincoat (雨衣), as revealed in a press conference the duo appeared in on 29 September 2015. The projected 2-month filming period for the movie that takes place in Shanghai and Tokyo is ongoing. The film is expected for a release in Spring 2016 in three countries.

Discography

Studio albums
 Swag (July 2, 2014)
 Get Ready (November 2, 2016)

Extended plays
 Loca (October 16, 2019)

Singles

* RIAJ Digital Track Chart was cancelled in July 2012.

Additional digital singles
 "Wanna Be Now" (May 11, 2011)
  (June 1, 2011)
 "Clone" (March 28, 2012)
 ”1%” (Dance Trial Edit) (May 15, 2013)
 “BRIGHTER” (December 4, 2013)
 “Crush” (June 18, 2014)
 ”COME PARTY” (December 10, 2014)
 “HIDE AND SEEK” (April 13, 2016)
 “OMG” (October 26, 2016)
 “Imagination Game” (July 25, 2018)
  (August 7, 2019)

Singles with AKB48

AKB48

Theater performances

With AKB48
Team A 1st Stage 
 
 
Team A 2nd Stage 
 
 
 
 
Team A 3rd Stage 
 
 
Team A 4th Stage 
 Faint
Himawarigumi 1st Stage 
 
 
Himawarigumi 2nd Stage 
 Confession
Team A 5th Stage 
 
Team K 6th Stage "Reset"

As AKB48 subunits
 Honegumi from AKB48
 Natto Angels
 Queen & Elizabeth
 Team Dragon from AKB48
 AKB Idoling !! !

Filmography

Movies
 Densen Uta (2007)
 Ai Ryutsu Centre (2008)
 Kamen Rider × Kamen Rider W & Decade: Movie War 2010 (2009) as Queen
 Kamen Rider W Forever: A to Z/The Gaia Memories of Fate (2010) as Queen
 Kamen Rider × Kamen Rider OOO & W Featuring Skull: Movie War Core (2010) as Queen
 Bad Boys J: Saigo ni Mamoru Mono (2013)
 The Virgin Psychics (2015) as Eri
 The Stare (2016)
 Raincoat (2016)
 星くず兄弟の新たな伝説 (2018)
 Imagination Game (2018)
 Diner (2019)
 Prison 13 (2019)
 Katsu Fūtarō!! (2019)

Dramas
 Kamen Rider W (TV Asahi, 2009) (as Queen)
 Majisuka Gakuen (TV Tokyo, 2010) (as Shibuya)
 Sakura kara no Tegami (NTV, 2011) (as herself)
 Majisuka Gakuen 2 (TV Tokyo, 2011) (as Shibuya)
 So Long! (NTV, 2013) 
 Bad Boys J (NTV, 2013) (as Nakai Kaori)
 Cook Keibu (TBS, 2016) 
 FRINGE-MAN (TV Tokyo, 2017) 
 Mikaiketsu'' (TV Asahi, 2018)

Radio
 AKB48  (2007-10-15, JOQR-AM)
  (2008-04-07 – present, JOKR-AM)
  (2010-04-09 –, JOLF-AM)

References

External links

  
 Tomomi Itano on King Records 
 Tomomi Itano on Ameba 
 Tomomi Itano (English page) on Google+

1991 births
Living people
Japanese idols
Japanese female models
Japanese women pop singers
Japanese television personalities
AKB48 members
King Records (Japan) artists
Musicians from Kanagawa Prefecture
Actresses from Yokohama
21st-century Japanese women singers
21st-century Japanese singers
21st-century Japanese actresses